Stanley P. Saunders is a New Testament scholar, whose particular research interest includes eschatology, creation and the Gospel of Matthew. He is also involved in issues of social justice particularly pertaining to the American criminal justice system and creation care.

Career
Saunders received a B.A. from San Jose Christian College (1975), a M.Div. from Emmanuel School of Religion (1980) and a Ph.D. from Princeton Theological Seminary (1990). He began his academic career as an assistant professor of New Testament at Wartburg Theological Seminary (1984-1988). He then took the position of assistant professor of New Testament at Columbia Theological Seminary (1991-1999) and now serves as associate professor of New Testament (1999–present).

Thought
In much of Saunders' work he asserts "we usually think that the goal of exegesis is to uncover the meanings in a text. But ‘meaning’ is discovered more in the dialogues that transpire between interpreters, their communities and worlds, the text, the worlds of the text, and the tradition." He is a proponent of the school of biblical interpretation which takes into account all external factors in the current setting, not just the text itself. This has led to an increased emphasis of how scripture engages the contemporary world and its current issues, such as care for the earth and the injustices of the criminal justice system.

Works

Books

}

Chapters

 - "Matthew 6:1-6, 16-21"; "Mark 9:1-9"; "Mark 1:9-14."

Edited by
Editorial Board Member and Contributor to Elizabeth Johnson and Cynthia Jarvis, eds., Feasting on the Gospels (Westminster John Knox Press, 2013-).

Journal arcticles

 - (Also published in Campbell and Saunders, The Word on the Street)

References

External links
 
Outcry: Faith Voices Against Gun Violence
Teach-in On Capital Punishment and the Church

Living people
Columbia Theological Seminary faculty
American biblical scholars
New Testament scholars
Christian scholars
Princeton Theological Seminary alumni
Climate activists
Year of birth missing (living people)